Scrubs, an American comedy-drama series, has been nominated for a variety of different awards including 17 Emmy Awards (with two wins), in categories such as casting, cinematography, directing, editing, and writing. Its fourth season earned the series its first nomination for Outstanding Comedy Series.

Series regulars Zach Braff, Donald Faison, Sarah Chalke, John C. McGinley, Judy Reyes and Christa Miller all earned nominations for their acting. Braff's performance was very praised, and he was nominated for an Emmy and three Golden Globe Awards. Despite this, only Faison and Reyes won awards.

"My Musical" is one of the most critically acclaimed episodes of Scrubs and was nominated for five Emmy Awards, a Cinema Audio Society Award and a Golden Reel Award, with one Emmy and one Golden Reel Award won.

The show won the 2002, 2008, and 2009 Humanitas Prize in the 30-minute category for the episodes "My Old Lady", "My Long Goodbye" and "My Last Words" respectively. While the episodes "My Screw Up", "My Way Home" and "My Fallen Idol" received nominations.

The fifth season episode "My Way Home" earned the show a Peabody Award, the industry’s most competitive honor.

American Latino Media Arts Award 
The ALMA Awards are awarded to Latino performers only. Judy Reyes, the only Latino member of the cast, has been nominated three times for two wins, and Linda Mendoza, who had directed an episode, also received a nomination.

Artios Awards

BET Comedy Awards

BMI TV Music Awards

Cinema Audio Society Awards

Emmy Awards

Golden Globe Awards 
Braff was nominated for the Golden Globe award for Best Actor in a Television Series, Comedy or Musical in 2005, 2006 and 2007, but lost to Jason Bateman of Arrested Development in 2005, to Steve Carell of The Office in 2006, and to Alec Baldwin of 30 Rock in 2007.

Golden Reel Awards

Hollywood Foreign Press Association Awards

Humanitas Prize

Imagen Awards

NAACP Image Awards

Peabody Awards

People's Choice Awards

Producers of the Year Awards

Satellite Awards

Teen Choice Awards 
The Teen Choice Awards are voted on by teenagers. Scrubs has been nominated for 15 awards, but has never won. Zach Braff has been nominated for five awards and Donald Faison has been nominated for four. In 2003, Sarah Chalke had received her only nomination for her role on Scrubs.

Television Critics Association Awards

Writers Guild of America TV Awards

Young Artists Awards

References

awards
Scrubs